Renato Petit de Ory, better known by its French name, René Petit (8 October 1899 – 14 October 1989) was a Franco-Spanish engineer, known for being a footballer in his youth. He was one of the most popular players in Spanish football in the 1910s, 1920s and 1930s, playing for Real Madrid and Real Unión, and becoming a member of the France national team. He represented France at the 1920 Summer Olympics.

Biography
Renato or René Petit lived his life traveling between Spain and France. The son of a French engineer who held the post of head of traffic at the Company of Railways in Northern Spain. His mother was Spanish, more specifically born in Madrid.

Born in Dax, France – which may be considered as a coincidence, since his mother had traveled to that town for treatments at the thermal waters – his childhood was spent in the Basque Country, between the towns of Irun and Hondarribia, the former town being the terminus of the Spanish rail network, where his father worked. Petit lived in a wealthy family and had a thorough education of the French type. At 12, he moved to live in Madrid, where he attended high school at the Colegio El Pilar.

Football career
Petit never considered himself a striker, but a player who provided passing and support. He could play center forward but most of his career he played as a midfielder. Many consider that Petit modernized Spanish football, by establishing passing and team play against the previously existing anarchy.

Madrid FC
At the El Pilar college, Petit started out playing as a centre forward; from there he went to Real Madrid C.F.'s reserve team. At the age of 14, he debuted with the first team.

Rene and his elder brother, Juan Petit, made themselves noticed during the 1914–15 season at Madrid. At that time, Rene was 15 years old. Petit became one of the stars of Real Madrid in the 1910s, being slim and powerful, he can be considered the first player of the modern era because of its ability to interpret the game.

With Petit in the first team, Madrid reached the final of the Spanish Cup on two occasions, in 1916 and 1917, winning the title on the latter occasion. The 1917 final against Arenas de Getxo marked the consecration of the 17-year-old Petit; an individual piece of brilliance from René, dribbling past all who came in front of him, allowed Madrid to equalize in the 75th minute, thus forcing extra-time in which Ricardo Álvarez scored the winner. His older brother didn't play in the match, since shortly before the final he was drafted into the French army. He was severely injured in World War I and this put an end to his playing career prematurely.

Petit's career at Madrid is summarized in 29 games and 13 goals, a Spanish Cup, and two regional championships.

Real Unión
Petit, rather than remain connected to Real Madrid, preferred to continue playing football for the team of his hometown, the Real Unión de Irún, which he joined in 1917. He played a vital role in helping his new side reach the 1918 Copa del Rey Final, where he contributed to the defeat of his former team, Madrid, and thus winning his second Cup title. In 1924 he won yet another Copa del Rey defeating Real Madrid again in the 1924 final thanks to a lonely goal from José Echeveste.

International career
Being an Madrid FC player, he was eligible to play for the Madrid national team, being in the line-up of the team's first-ever international match on 10 May 1915 against Catalonia, which was held at the Campo de O'Donnell for the 1915 Prince of Asturias Cup, the first edition of the Prince of Asturias Cup, and although they lost 1-2, Petit scored the consolation goal, thus being the author of the first goal in the history of the team. In the decisive game against a Basque XI, he missed a penalty in a eventual 1-1 draw that was enough for the Basques to win the cup.

When he joined Real Unión, he become eligible to play for the Gipuzkoa national team, and he was part of the squad that participated in two editions of the Prince of Asturias Cup, in 1922-23 and 1923-24, with both campaigns finishing in a quarter-final exit at the hands of Catalonia, losing 0-3 and 1-2 respectively, with the author of their only goal in the competition being René Petit.

He also represented France at the 1920 Summer Olympics, playing two games and scoring none.

Honours

Club
Madrid FC
Copa del Rey:
Winners (1): 1917

Real Unión
Copa del Rey:
Winners (1): 1918

International
Madrid
Prince of Asturias Cup:
Runner-up (1): 1916

References

External links 
 Rene Petit's biography at Real Madrid official website (Spanish)
 NFT Profile

1899 births
1989 deaths
Sportspeople from Landes (department)
People from Hondarribia
French footballers
France international footballers
Olympic footballers of France
Footballers from the Basque Country (autonomous community)
Footballers at the 1920 Summer Olympics
French people of Spanish descent
Association football midfielders
Real Madrid CF players
Real Unión footballers
Stade Bordelais (football) players
La Liga players
French expatriate sportspeople in Spain
French expatriate footballers
Expatriate footballers in Spain
Footballers from Nouvelle-Aquitaine